The Pakistan Air Force (PAF) is the aerial warfare branch of the Pakistan Armed Forces, tasked primarily with the aerial defence of Pakistan, with a secondary role of providing air support to the Pakistan Army and Navy when required, and a tertiary role of providing strategic airlift capability to Pakistan. , as per the International Institute for Strategic Studies, the PAF has more than 70,000 active-duty personnel and operates at least 970 aircraft.
Its primary mandate and mission is "to provide, in synergy with other inter-services, the most efficient, assured and cost effective aerial defence of Pakistan." Since its establishment in 1947, the PAF has been involved in various combat operations, providing aerial support to the operations and relief efforts of the Pakistani military. Under Article 243, the Constitution of Pakistan appoints the President of Pakistan as the civilian Commander-in-Chief of the Pakistan Armed Forces. The Chief of Air Staff (CAS), by statute a four-star air officer, is appointed by the President with the consultation and confirmation needed from the Prime Minister of Pakistan.

History

1959 Indian aerial intrusion

On 10 April 1959, on the occasion of the Eid ul-Fitr festival holiday in Pakistan, an Indian Air Force (IAF) English Electric Canberra B(I)58 of No. 106 Squadron entered Pakistani airspace on a photo reconnaissance mission. Two PAF F-86F Sabres (Flt. Lt. M. N. Butt (leader) and Flt. Lt. M. Yunis) of No. 15 Squadron on Air Defence Alert (ADA) were scrambled from Sargodha Air Base to intercept the IAF aircraft. Butt attempted to bring down the Canberra by firing his Sabre's machine guns, but the Canberra was flying at an altitude of more than 50,000 feet—beyond the operational ceiling of the F-86F. When Yunis took over from his leader, the Canberra suddenly lost height while executing a turn over Rawalpindi. Yunis fired a burst that struck the Canberra at an altitude of 47,500 feet and brought it down over Rawat, marking the first direct aerial victory of the PAF. Both crew members of the IAF Canberra ejected and were captured by Pakistani authorities. They were subsequently released after remaining in detention for some time.

Indo-Pakistani War of 1965

The PAF fleet at the time consisted of 12 F-104 Starfighters, some 120 F-86 Sabres and around 20 B-57 Canberra bombers. The PAF claims to have had complete air superiority over the battle area from the second day of operations. However, IAF Air Chief Marshal Arjan Singh claimed that, despite having been qualitatively inferior to the PAF, the IAF allegedly achieved total air superiority in three days.

Many publications have credited the PAF's successes in combat with the IAF to its U.S.-quality equipment, claiming it to be superior to the aircraft operated by the IAF and giving the PAF a "qualitative advantage". This statement has been refuted by some officials in Pakistan, who say that the IAF's MiG-21, Hawker Hunter and Folland Gnat aircraft had better performance than the PAF's F-86 fighters, without accounting for the obvious quantitative advantage that the IAF possessed. According to retired PAF Air Commodore Sajad Haider, the F-86 Sabre was inferior in terms of both power and speed to the IAF's Hawker Hunter.

Sajad Haider, who flew with No. 19 squadron also stated that the F-104 Starfighter did not deserve its reputation as "the pride of the PAF" because it "was unsuited to the tactical environment of the region. It was a high-level interceptor designed to neutralize Soviet strategic bombers in altitudes above 40,000 feet." Nevertheless, the IAF is believed to have feared facing the Starfighter in combat despite its lack of effectiveness in comparison to the IAF's fleet of Folland Gnats. According to Indian sources, the F-86F performed reasonably well against the IAF's Hunters but not as well against the Gnat, which was nicknamed the Sabre Slayer by the IAF.

Per India, most of the aircraft losses of the IAF were allegedly on the ground while the PAF suffered most of their losses in aerial combat, a claim that has widely been accepted by most international sources as "a stretch". The IAF ran a larger offensive air campaign by devoting 40% of its air effort to offensive air support alone.

The two countries have made contradictory claims of combat losses during the war and few neutral sources have verified the claims of either country, as is the case with most India-Pakistan conflicts. The PAF claims that it shot down 104 IAF aircraft and lost 19 of its own, while the IAF claimed it shot down 73 PAF aircraft while losing 60 of its own. According to most independent and neutral sources, the PAF lost some 20 aircraft while the IAF lost somewhere between 60 and 75.

Despite the intense fighting throughout the course of the war, the conflict was effectively a stalemate and inconclusive in its result.

Indo-Pakistani War of 1971

By late 1971, the intensification of the independence movement in erstwhile East Pakistan led to the Bangladesh Liberation War between West Pakistan and East Pakistan (later joined by India). On 22 November 1971, 10 days before the start of a full-scale war, four PAF F-86 Sabre jets attacked Indian and Mukti Bahini positions at Garibpur, near the international border. Two of the four PAF Sabres were shot down and one damaged by the IAF's Gnats. On 3 December, India formally declared war against Pakistan following massive preemptive strikes by the PAF against IAF installations in Srinagar, Ambala, Sirsa, Halwara and Jodhpur. However, the IAF did not suffer any significant losses because the leadership had anticipated such a move and consequently, precautions were taken. The IAF was quick to respond to Pakistani airstrikes, following which the PAF carried out mostly defensive sorties.

Hostilities officially ended at 14:30 GMT on 17 December, after the fall of Dacca on 15 December. The PAF flew about 2,840 sorties and destroyed 71 IAF aircraft while losing 43 of its own.

1979–1989 Soviet–Afghan War

In 1979, the PAF's Chief of Air Staff, Air Chief Marshal Anwar Shamim, was told by then-President and Chief of Army Staff General Zia-ul-Haq, that Pakistan had reliable intelligence on Indian plans to attack and destroy Pakistan's nuclear research facilities in Kahuta. ACM Shamim told General Zia-ul-Haq that, in the PAF's current state, "Indian aircraft could reach the area in three minutes whereas the PAF would take eight minutes, allowing the Indians to attack the facility and return before the PAF could defend or retaliate". Because Kahuta was close to the Indian border, a consensus was reached acknowledging that the best way to deter a possible Indian attack would be to procure new advanced fighters and weaponry. These could be used to mount a retaliatory attack on India's nuclear research facilities in Trombay in the event of an Indian attack on Kahuta. It was decided the most suitable aircraft would be the F-16 Fighting Falcon, which the United States eventually agreed to supply after the PAF refused to purchase the F-5. In 1983, when the first batch of F-16s reached Pakistan, ACM Shamim informed Zia of the PAF's increasing capability to effectively respond to an attack on the nuclear research facilities at Kahuta.

Due to rising tensions with the Soviet Union due to its invasion of Afghanistan, Pakistan's ISI systematically coordinated with the CIA, MI6 and Mossad to secure American resources and armaments for the Afghan mujahideen who were combating the invading Soviet forces. Various reports during this period widely indicated that the PAF had in fact covertly engaged in aerial combat against the Soviet Air Force in support of the Afghan Air Force during the course of the conflict; one of which belonged to Alexander Rutskoy.

A letter of agreement for up to 28 F-16A and 12 F-16B was signed in December 1981. The contracts, Peace Gate I and Peace Gate II were for 6 and 34 Block 15 models respectively, which would be powered by the F100-PW-200 engine. The first Peace Gate I aircraft was accepted at Fort Worth in October 1982. Two F-16A and four F-16B were subsequently delivered to Pakistan in 1983, with the first F-16 arriving at PAF Base Sargodha (now known as PAF Base Mushaf) on 15 January 1983 flown by Squadron Leader Shahid Javed. The 34 remaining aircraft as part of Peace Gate II were delivered between 1983 and 1987.

Between May 1986 and November 1988, the PAF's newly acquired F-16s had shot down at least eight intruding aircraft from Afghanistan. The first three of these (one Su-22, one probable Su-22, and one An-26) were shot down by two pilots from No. 9 Squadron. Pilots of No. 14 Squadron destroyed the remaining five intruders (two Su-22s, two MiG-23s, and one Su-25). Most of these kills were by the AIM-9 Sidewinder, but at least one (a Su-22) was destroyed by cannon fire. Pakistani Flight Lieutenant Khalid Mahmoud is credited with three of these kills.

The PAF is believed to have evaluated the French Dassault Mirage 2000 in early 1981 and was planning to evaluate the F-16 Fighting Falcon afterwards.

U.S. arms embargo (1990–2001)

After the Pressler amendment was passed, the United States placed sanctions and an arms embargo on Pakistan starting on 6 October 1990 due to the continuance of the country's nuclear weapons research program. All eleven Peace Gate III F-16s, along with seven F-16A and ten F-16B of the 60 Peace Gate IV F-16s, which had been built by the end of 1994 were embargoed and put into storage on U.S. soil.

Desperate for a new high-tech combat aircraft, between late 1990 and 1993 the PAF evaluated the European Panavia Tornado MRCA (multi-role combat aircraft), and ultimately rejected it. France's Dassault Mirage 2000E and an offer from Poland for the supply of MiG-29s and Su-27s were also considered, but no deal materialized. In 1992, the PAF once again looked towards the French Mirage 2000, reviving a proposal from the early 1980s to procure around 20–40 aircraft, but a sale did not occur because France did not want to sell a fully capable version due to pressure from the United States. In August 1994, the PAF was offered the Saab JAS-39 Gripen by Sweden, but the sale did not occur because 20% of the Gripen's components were sourced from the U.S., which was still maintaining sanctions on Pakistan.

In mid-1992, Pakistan was close to signing a contract for the supply of 40 Dassault Mirage 2000s, equipped with Thomson-CSF RDM/7 radars from France, although U.S. sanctions also prevented this deal from finalizing

In mid-1994, it was reported that Russian manufacturers Sukhoi and Mikoyan were offering the Su-27 and MiG-29, but Pakistan was reported to be negotiating for supply of the Mirage 2000–5. French and Russian teams visited Pakistan on 27 November 1994 and it was speculated that the interest in Russian aircraft was to pressure France into reducing the price of the Mirage 2000. The stated requirement was for up to 40 aircraft.

War in Afghanistan (2001–2021) 

The Pakistan Air Force is believed to have had a primary role in the alleged evacuation of Taliban personnel by the Pakistani military from Afghanistan. However, Pakistani and American officials have denied any such airlift taking place.

2008 post-Mumbai attacks air alert

After the 2008 Mumbai attacks, the Pakistan Air Force was put on high alert in anticipation of any potential Indian accusations and offensives. It deployed to all its wartime locations and started routine combat air patrols. The speed and intensity of the deployment and PAF's readiness took the Indian Army High Command by surprise and later reports suggest that was the main factor to influence the Indians' decision of not going for cross border raids inside Pakistan. The PAF was issued a standing order to launch an immediate counter-attack in case of an air attack from India, after a call from the Indian Foreign Minister Pranab Mukherjee to the Pakistani President Asif Ali Zardari (the call later turned out to be a hoax).

2011 U.S. raid in Abbottabad

An initial investigation report revealed that the Pakistan Air Force (PAF) reported the movement of some half-a-dozen planes near the Jalalabad border at 23:00 before American helicopters entered Abbottabad to kill Osama bin Laden. "One aircraft was identified as a US AWACS and the remaining five were recognized as F-18 jets of the US. These planes flew near the Pakistani border, but did not cross into the airspace of Pakistan,"

On the detection of an intrusion, PAF jets on air defence alert were scrambled and the PAF immediately took adequate operational measures as per standard operating procedure. The PAF aircraft continued their presence in the Abbottabad area until early morning and later returned to their air bases.

However, the fact that so many non-stealth aircraft had entered Pakistani airspace, stayed for three hours to carry out a major operation, and that PAF jets only arrived at the location 24 minutes after the American helicopters had left made a senior PAF official term it "one of the most embarrassing incidents in Pakistan's history".

Counter-insurgency operations in North-West Pakistan (2001–2021) 

The Pakistan Army faced several problems during its 2009 offensive against the Taliban in North-West Pakistan. Hundreds of thousands of Pakistanis vacated the area when the offensive was announced and, eventually, over two million had to be accommodated in refugee camps. The offensive was to be completed as quickly as possible to allow the refugees to return to their homes but the army's fleet attack helicopters were not sufficient enough to provide adequate support to infantry on the ground. The PAF was sent into action against the Taliban to make up for the lack of helicopter gunships. Because the PAF was trained and equipped to fight a conventional war, a new "counter-terrorist doctrine" had to be improvised.

The PAF's Saffron Bandit exercise focused on extensive training of combat personnel to undertake COIN operations. New equipment was inducted to improve the PAF's joint intelligence, surveillance and reconnaissance (ISR) capabilities. A C-130 transport aircraft was indigenously modified for day/night ISR operations.

Use of laser-guided bombs was increased to 80% of munitions used, as compared to 40% in the previous 1960s Bajaur campaign. A small corps of ground spotters were trained and used by the PAF, in addition to Pakistan Army spotters, to identify high-value targets.

Prior to the Pakistan Army's offensive into South Waziristan, the PAF attacked militant infrastructure with 500 lb and 2000 lb bombs.

A number of civilian casualties occurred during PAF airstrikes on 10 April 2010 in the FATA tribal region. According to sources from the Pakistani military, the first bombing was targeted at a gathering of militants in a compound. Locals who had quickly moved onto the scene of the first airstrike to recover the dead and wounded were then killed by a second airstrike. While there is no confirmed death toll, it is widely believed that at least 30 civilian deaths had occurred according to the military approximations, whereas a local official stated that at least 73 locals, including women and children, were killed. A six-member committee of tribal elders from the area tasked with finding the exact number of civilian casualties reported that 61 civilians were killed and 21 were wounded. This was not confirmed by government figures but Pakistan's then-Chief of Army Staff, General Ashfaq Kayani, gave a public apology on 17 April. It is reported that BBC News and several other media correspondences were not allowed to take interviews from the injured.

2019 India–Pakistan standoff 

Following the Pulwama attack in Jammu and Kashmir, India accused involvement of Pakistani hands in this incident. In response, India carried outairstrikes in the vicinity of the town of Balakot in Khyber Pakhtunkhwa province, several miles inside the province's boundary with Pakistan-administered Kashmir. Pakistan's militaryclaimed that the Indian planes dropped their payload in an uninhabited wooded hilltop area near Balakot after being intercepted by PAF fighter jets.

On 27 February 2019, when a standoff between India and Pakistan had begun, Pakistan claimed to have struck six targets near Indian military installations inside Indian Controlled Kashmir, which hit open spaces  through a codenamed "Operation Swift Retort".

Indian Air Force jets were scrambled to intercept the PAF jets inside Jammu and Kashmir. Following the interception, a fierce dogfight ensued and Pakistani aircraft shot down an Indian MiG-21.  Meanwhile a MI 17 helicopter of the Indian Army Aviation branch carrying 6 Indian soldiers was shot down by Indian air defense system resulting in losses of all crew and 6 Indian soldiers.

India stated that it had only lost a single aircraft (a MiG-21) while claiming to have shot down a Pakistani F-16. Pakistan rejected India's statement, stating that no F-16s were deployed. Pakistan would later go on to accept that F16s had been used, but maintained that none of them were shot down. Pakistan also claimed to have shot down a Sukhoi Su-30 MKI, a claim rejected by Indian authorities. Wing Commander Abhinandan Varthaman, who was piloting the MiG-21 Bison, was captured and arrested by the Pakistani military upon being shot down. He was held for two days before being released at the Wagah-Attari border crossing on 1 March.

Initially, Pakistani Military officials claimed to have had two pilots in custody, one of whom died while undergoing treatment, a claim which was later changed to having only Abhinandan in custody. This was taken to be evidence of a Pakistani pilot being shot down by some Indian sources.

2022 Pakistani airstrikes in Afghanistan 

At least 47 people were killed and 22 injured in two airstrikes by Pakistani forces along the border with Afghanistan on 16 April 2022. The Taliban summoned Pakistan's ambassador in Kabul and registered their protest against the military airstrikes inside Afghanistan.

Structure

Headquarters
Air Headquarters (AHQ), Islamabad

Commands
Northern Air Command (NAC), Peshawar
Central Air Command (CAC), Sargodha
Southern Air Command (SAC), Karachi
Air Defence Command (ADC), Rawalpindi
Air Force Strategic Command (AFSC), Islamabad

Training Establishments
Pakistan Air Force Academy, Risalpur
Combat Commanders' School (CCS), Sargodha
PAF Airpower Centre of Excellence (PAF ACE), Sargodha
PAF Air War College, Karachi

Weapons Production Establishments
Pakistan Aeronautical Complex (PAC), Kamra
Air Weapons Complex (AWC), Kamra

Bases

The PAF has 22 airbases of which 14 are flying bases and 8 are non-flying bases. Flying bases are operational bases from which aircraft operate during both peacetime and wartime; whereas non-flying bases conduct either training, administration, maintenance, air defence operations, or mission support.

Flying bases
1 PAF Base Mushaf (Sargodha)
2 PAF Base Bholari (Bholari)  Jamshoro District, Sindh
3 PAF Base Masroor (Karachi)
4 PAF Base Rafiqui (Shorkot)
5 PAF Base Peshawar (Peshawar)
6 PAF Base Murid (Chakwal)
7 PAF Base Samungli (Quetta)
8 PAF Base M.M. Alam (Mianwali)
9 PAF Base Minhas (Kamra)
10 PAF Base Nur Khan (Rawalpindi)
11 PAF Base Faisal (Karachi)
12 PAF Base Risalpur (Pakistan Air Force Academy) (Risalpur)
13 PAF Base Shahbaz (Jacobabad)
14 PAF Base Sukkur (Dadu)

Non-flying bases
PAF Base Korangi Creek (Karachi)
PAF Base Malir (Karachi)
PAF Base Lower Topa (Murree)
PAF Base Kallar Kahar (Kallar Kahar)
PAF Base Kohat (Kohat)
PAF Base Lahore (Lahore)
PAF Base Sakesar (Sakesar)
PAF Base Kalabagh (Nathia Gali)

Squadrons

Rank structure

Structure of commissioned officer ranks:

Structure of enlisted ranks:

Civilian occupations
Gazetted Officer
Steganographer
Stenotypist
Warehouse and Factory Personnel
Clerk

Special forces

The Pakistan Air Force's Special Services Wing (SSW) is the branch's elite special operations fighting force. Originally coming into existence following the Indo-Pakistani War of 1965, the SSW is heavily modelled off of the United States Air Force's Special Tactics Squadrons with some elements inspired by the United States Army Rangers. The unit remained active but saw little prioritization by the Pakistani military until after the Kargil War. In late 1999, the SSW was largely revived and restructured for active service and is currently fielding around 1,200 troops.

Women in the Pakistan Air Force

In its early history, women had been employed by Pakistan's armed forces—albeit in non-combat roles only. It was commonplace to find women serving in service branches such as the medical corps (as nurses or in other similar disciplines). Aside from these exceptions, the Pakistan Air Force (PAF) had remained strictly all-male throughout its history, and women (as well as male youths under the age of 18) were prohibited from being deployed for combat, despite Muhammad Ali Jinnah's contradictory views on the subject upon Pakistan's independence. However, since 2003, women have been allowed to enrol in the aerospace engineering program and others at the PAF Academy in Risalpur—including fighter pilot training programmes. It has been stated that physical and academic standards are not compromised or exploited to favour women, and those who do not achieve the same performance as their male counterparts are immediately dropped from the course, however the level of enforcement of this rule is unknown. Within the structure of the PAF, a level of segregation between the genders is maintained in line with traditional views. For example, early-morning parades are performed together but some parts of training—mainly physical exercises—are done with males and females separated. According to Squadron Leader Shazia Ahmed, the officer in charge of the first female cadets in the PAF and a psychologist, this seems to improve the confidence levels of women.

In 2005, it was reported that two batches in the PAF Academy's flying wing contained at least ten women, with many more in the engineering and aerospace wings. One such woman—Cadet Saba Khan from Quetta, Balochistan—applied after reading a newspaper advertisement stating that the PAF was seeking female cadets. She was one of the first four women to pass the first stages of flying training on propeller-driven light aircraft and move onto faster jet-powered training aircraft.

In March 2006, the PAF officially inducted a batch of 34 fighter pilots which included the organization's first four female fighter pilots. Three years of training had been completed by the pilots at PAF Academy - Risalpur before they graduated and were awarded their Flying Badges during the ceremony. Certificates of honour were handed to the successful cadets by General Ahsan Saleem Hayat, then the vice-chief of the Pakistan Army, who acknowledged that the PAF was the first branch of the Pakistani military to introduce women to its combat units. One of the women, Flying Officer Nadia Gul, was awarded a trophy for best academic achievement. The other female graduates were Mariam Khalil, Saira Batool and the above-mentioned Cadet Saba Khan. A second batch of pilots, including three female pilots, graduated from the 117th GD(P) course at PAF Academy - Risalpur in September 2006. The Sword of Honour for best all-round performance was awarded to Aviation Cadet Saira Amin, the first female pilot to win the award. Aviation Cadet Saira Amin also had won the Asghar Hussain Trophy for best performance in academics.

In September 2009, it was reported that seven women had qualified as operational fighter pilots on the Chengdu F-7, the first female combat pilots to do so in the PAF's history. Commanding Officer Tanvir Piracha emphasized that if the female pilots "are not good enough as per their male counterparts, we don't let them fly." It was noted that some of the female pilots wear the hijab while others do not, as it is an optional exception to uniform standards should the woman wish to don one.

Religious minorities in the Pakistan Air Force
Since its inception, religious minorities have been free to pursue careers within the Pakistan Armed Forces, with the exception of Hindus until 2001. Following its involvement in the global U.S.-led War on Terror, Pakistan released the Hindu minority in the country from the discriminatory law and granted them the same freedoms that were already present for their Christian, Sikh and other various counterparts. Some notable religious minority figures in the Pakistan Air Force include: Air Vice Marshal Eric Gordon Hall, a Christian who served as the Base Commander of Chaklala Air Base during the Indo-Pakistani War of 1965. Air Commodore Nazir Latif and Group Captain Cecil Chaudhry (both Christians) fought in the Indo-Pakistani War of 1965 and later helped establish the Combat Commanders School (CCS). Wing Commander Melvin Leslie Middlecoat was the Commanding Officer of No. 9 Squadron during the 1965 war, he and Squadron Leader Peter Christy fought and were KIA in the Indo-Pakistani War of 1971. Patrick Desmond Callaghan was another Christian officer who rose to the rank of Air Vice Marshal. Wing Commander Ronald Felix has been a notable Christian pilot known for being the first to fly the jointly-built Chinese and Pakistani JF-17 Thunder fighter jet since 2010 and was one of two PAF pilots flying the JF-17 at the 2011 Izmir Air Show in Turkey.

In 2020, the Pakistan Air Force recruited Rahul Dev, a Hindu from Tharparkar, Sindh in a major breakthrough for the Hindu minority from this remote distant area of Sindh  . He was commissioned as a general duty pilot officer on 6 May 2020.

Aircraft inventory

Combat aircraft 

 General Dynamics F-16 Fighting Falcon: The F-16 Fighting Falcon currently serves as the primary air fighter of the Pakistan Air Force (PAF) in addition to its ground attack capabilities. The PAF currently has ~75 F-16s in active service, comprising 44 F-16AM/BM Block 15 MLU, 13 F-16A/B ADF and 18 F-16C/D Block 52+ variants.
 PAC/CAC JF-17 Thunder: A multirole combat aircraft produced by Pakistan with Chinese assistance, the JF-17 was developed to replace Pakistan's aging fleets of A-5, F-7P/PG, Mirage III, and Mirage 5aircraft. Currently, 134 JF-17s are in active service with the PAF, comprising 47 JF-17A Block 1, 62 JF-17A Block 2, and 25 JF-17B Block 2 variants. A further 50 aircraft of the Block III model, incorporating advanced avionics systems and a new AESA radar, are expected to be produced. In addition the PAF is also expected to order 26 of the two-seat JF-17B variant. The JF-17 is set to become the "backbone" of the PAF alongside its fleet of American F-16s.
 Chengdu J-10C: The J-10C is a multirole combat aircraft. In March 2022, the initial batches of J-10s began to arrive in Pakistan.
 Dassault Mirage III: Having been in service since 1967, the Mirage III, together with the Mirage 5, serves as the primary strike aircraft of the PAF. The PAF operates more than 80 Mirage III aircraft, comprising multiple variants including the Mirage IIIEP, IIIEL and IIIO fighter-bomber variants, the latter of which have been upgraded under Project ROSE, the Mirage IIIRP reconnaissance variant and the Mirage IIIBE, IIID, IIIDL and IIIDP training variants, the latter of which have also been upgraded under Project ROSE.
 Dassault Mirage 5: The Mirage 5, together with the Mirage III, serves as the PAF's primary strike aircraft. The PAF operates around 90 Mirage 5 aircraft of multiple variants, including Mirage 5PA, PA2, PA3 and 5F ground attack aircraft, the latter of which have been upgraded under Project ROSE, the Mirage 5DR reconnaissance variant and the Mirage 5DD and DPA2 training variants.
 Chengdu F-7PG: The Chengdu F-7 serves primarily as an interceptor, and around 140 aircraft are in service. The PAF has phased out most of its F-7P aircraft from active service, with the remaining aircraft set to be replaced by the JF-17 Thunder in the coming years. The F-7PG variant remains the primary variant to remain in service with the PAF, while the two seat FT-7P and FT-7PG variants are in use as operational conversion trainers.

Special mission aircraft

 Saab 2000: The PAF has been operating the Saab 2000 using the Erieye radar as its primary AEW&C platform since 2009. Out of the original four Saab 2000 in service, one was destroyed and two were damaged in a Taliban attack on PAF Base Minhas in August 2012. The damaged aircraft were subsequently repaired and put back into service. The PAF had ordered three more Erieye AEW&C aircraft from Saab with the first batch having been delivered in 2017.
 Shaanxi Y-8: Four ZDK-03 variants, locally designated as the Karakoram Eagle, are also in service. These incorporate a Chinese AESA radar mounted on a Y-8F-600 airframe.
 Dassault Falcon 20: The PAF operates three modified Dassault Falcon 20 aircraft with a primary role in electronic warfare.

Transport aircraft 

 Lockheed C-130 Hercules: The C-130 Hercules has served as the backbone of the PAF's transport fleet since its induction in 1962. 15 aircraft, five C-130Bs, nine C-130Es and one L-100, are currently in service. PAF C-130s have been upgraded with Allison T56-A-15 turboprops and extended fatigue lives.
 CASA/IPTN CN-235: The PAF operates three CN-235-220 STOL transporters as medium transport, in addition to one aircraft equipped for VIP transport operations.
 Harbin Y-12: Three Harbin Y-12 are operated as light utility aircraft by the PAF.
 Gulfsteam IV: The PAF currently operates two Gulfstream IV-SP variants.
 Embraer Phenom 100: Approximately four of these aircraft are in service with the PAF for transportation purposes.
 Cessna Citation Excel: Currently, only one of these aircraft are used by the PAF.

Aerial refuelling aircraft

 Ilyushin Il-78: The PAF operates four Il-78MPs equipped with UPAZ refuelling pods, procured from Ukraine, as aerial refuelling tankers. The Il-78 can also be used as a general transporter by removing the refuel tanks from the cargo hold.

Trainer aircraft 

 PAC MFI-17 Mushshak: The Mushshak serves as the PAF's basic trainer. The PAF operates 120 Mushshak aircraft, including the improved Super Mushshak variant.
 Cessna T-37 Tweet: The PAF has operated the T-37 as a basic jet trainer since 1962, and these have been supplemented over the years with additional aircraft from Turkey and the United States.
 Hongdu JL-8: The K-8 is operated as an intermediate trainer, before cadets move on to conversion trainers. The K-8 is also operated by the PAF's aerobatics display team, the Sherdils.
 Shenyang J-6: A small number of FT-6s remain in service as jet trainers.

Helicopters 

 Aérospatiale Alouette III: The Alouette III served as the PAF's primary search and rescue platform since the 1960s, also serving as a liaison aircraft.
 AgustaWestland AW139: Beginning in 2018, the PAF started inducting the AW139 to replace the venerable Alouette. The first AW139 unit became operational in March of that same year.
 Mil Mi-17: The PAF also operates the Mi-171, which serves primarily in CSAR roles.

Air defence systems

 MBDA Spada 2000 – A medium altitude air defence system consisting of a radar with a range of 60 kilometres and four 6-cell missile launchers that can intercept enemy missiles and aircraft at a range of over 20 kilometres. A contract for ten batteries was signed when Aspide was selected over competing systems from Raytheon, Diehl BGT and Saab AB after pre-contract firing tests in Pakistan with assistance from the Italian Air Force. Reports state that Pakistan tested the air defence system in July 2010, following deliveries of the first few batteries. Deliveries of all ten batteries are reported to have been completed in 2013 with further orders possible upon immediate request. The missile system was tested by the Range & Instrumentation Division of SUPARCO in synergy with the PAF. Three drones were successfully intercepted and shot down by the missile system following extensive testing. With the procurement of the Spada 2000, Pakistan reportedly decommissioned most of its Crotale short-range air defence missile systems.
 HQ-2 – The PAF extensively uses a Chinese adaptation of the Soviet S-75 Dvina high altitude air defence system, with reportedly 12 or more batteries procured in the 1970s.
 HQ-9 – In October 2003, it was reported that China had closed a deal with Pakistan to supply an unspecified number of FT-2000 systems, an anti-radiation variant of the HQ-9 long-range air defence system. However, in March 2009, a report was published stating that Pakistan was not considering importing the missile. It was reported in mid-2008 that Pakistan intended to purchase a high altitude air-missile defence system and the FD-2000, another variant of HQ-9, was expected to be chosen.
 AML HE 60-20: A modified version of the French Panhard armoured vehicle equipped with a 20mm anti-aircraft cannon used primarily for on-base security. At least five were originally in service in the late 1990s.

Drone technology
On 7 September 2015, Pakistan became the fifth nation globally to develop and use an armed unmanned combat aerial vehicle (drone), the NESCOM Burraq. Pakistan first started exploring drone technology when it acquired Falco drones from Selex Galileo for approximately $40 million in 2008. Since then, Pakistan has been developing variants of the original Falco drone in the Pakistan Aeronautical Complex (PAC) in collaboration with the Italian firm. The Burraq was developed which was based on the Falco's technology. By March 2015, Pakistan was able to test-fire Burraq armed with an air-to-surface missile named Barq with pin-point precision. Burraq drones were used extensively to provide support to the Pakistan Army during Operation Zarb-e-Azb.

Pakistan has already talked with Turkey to manufacture parts for Anka UAV and possibly to produce the combat drones locally. Also the CAIG Wing Loong II UCAVs will be produced in Pakistan with joint collaboration with China.

Modernisation and acquisitions

For a brief period, the Pakistan Air Force experienced a stall in modernization efforts, however this ended in April 2006 when the Pakistani cabinet approved the PAF's proposals to procure new aircraft and systems from several sources, including modern combat aircraft from the United States and China. The AFFDP 2019 (Armed Forces Development Programme 2019) would oversee the extensive modernization of the PAF from 2006 to 2019.

On 24 July 2008, the Bush administration informed the U.S. Congress that it planned to shift nearly $230 million of $300 million in aid from counter-terrorism programs to upgrading Pakistan's ageing F-16s. The administration had previously announced on 27 June 2008 that it was proposing to sell ITT Corporation's electronic warfare gear valued at up to $75 million to enhance Pakistan's existing inventory of F-16s. Pakistan has asked about buying as many as 21 AN/ALQ-211(V)9 Advanced Integrated Defensive Electronic Warfare Suite Pods (AIDEWS) as well as other related equipment. The proposed sale will ensure that the existing fleet is "compatible" with new F-16 Block 50/52 fighters being purchased by Islamabad.

After 9/11, the U.S. and Pakistan began discussing the release of the embargoed F-16s and Pakistan's ability to purchase new aircraft. Of the 28 F-16A/B built under the Peace Gate III/IV contracts and embargoed in 1990, 14 were delivered as EDA (Excess Defense Articles) from 2005 to 2008, two of which were delivered on 10 July 2007.

Between 2005 and 2008, 14 F-16A/B Block 15 OCU fighters were delivered to the PAF under renewed post-9/11 ties between the U.S. and Pakistan. These had originally been built for Pakistan under the Peace Gate III/IV contracts but were never delivered due to the subsequent U.S. arms embargo imposed on Pakistan in 1990.

To upgrade the F-16A/B fleet, 32 Falcon STAR kits were purchased for the original Peace Gate I aircraft and 35 Mid-Life Update (MLU) kits were ordered, with 11 more MLU kits optional. Four F-16A/B being upgraded in the U.S. to F-16AM/BM had an expected delivery date of December 2011. F-16A/B in the PAF's service were to be upgraded starting in October 2010 by Turkish Aerospace Industries, at a rate of one per month.

The Peace Drive I contract for 12 F-16C and six F-16D Block 52+ (Advanced Block 52) aircraft, powered by F100-PW-229 engines was signed on 30 September 2006. The first F-16 to be completed, an F-16D, was rolled out on 13 October 2009 and began flight testing immediately. The first batch of F-16C/D Block 52+, two F-16D and one F-16C landed at PAF Base Shahbaz, Jacobabad, on 26 June 2010. One more F-16C was received by 5 July 2010.

On 13 December 2008, the Government of Pakistan stated that two Indian Air Force aircraft were intercepted by the Pakistan Air Force a few kilometres inside Pakistani airspace. This charge is denied by the Indian government.

During talks with a delegation from the French Senate on 28 September 2009, Prime Minister Yousuf Raza Gilani stated that the PAF had used most of its stockpile of laser-guided munitions against militants in the Malakand and FATA regions and that replacements for such types of equipment were urgently required.

In December 2009, Pakistan saw the delivery of the PAF's first Saab 2000 Erieye AEW&C from Sweden and an Il-78MP aerial refuelling tanker/military transport aircraft from Ukraine.

The PAF was reported to be considering purchasing the Chinese Hongdu L-15 advanced jet trainer to train pilots for high-tech fighters such as the FC-20. Extensive evaluations of the aircraft took place in Pakistan in December 2009.

According to Air Chief Marshal (ACM) Rao Qamar Suleman (then Chief of Air Staff), the new fighters would eliminate the PAF's limitations in conducting precision night-time strike operations, as the existing capability was based on around 34 Dassault Mirage 5 fighters upgraded with new avionics for night-time precision strike missions under the Retrofit of Strike Element (ROSE) programme during 1999–2004. The SABIR (Special Airborne Mission Installation & Response System), a FLIR system that has Brite Star II and Star Safire III EO/IR sensors installed on a C-130 saw extensive usage during the Pakistani military's operations against militants in the FATA region.

In 2021, Pakistan agreed to buy 36 Chengdu J-10CP multirole fighter aircraft from China to counter the Dassault Rafale which India bought from France.

On March 11, 2022, PAF inducted modern J-10C fighter aircraft in its fleet, the formal ceremony was conducted at the Minhas Airbase Kamra.

Planned acquisitions
Mass production of the PAC JF-17 Thunder A Block-3, a 4.5 generation aircraft, is underway to replace the F-16 as the "backbone" of the Pakistan Air Force's arsenal. After every 3–5 years, newer blocks of the aircraft are expected to be produced. Pakistan has been in extensive talks with China to acquire between 40 and 60 upgraded fifth-generation Shenyang FC-31 stealth fighter aircraft (J-31 for short). The TAI TF-X, another fifth-generation aircraft under development by Turkey (intended to operate with critical assets such as the American F-35 Lightning II) has also been a viable offer for Pakistan, as these fighters can greatly strengthen the PAF's fleet before the country's own fifth-generation fighter is developed under Project Azm. Pakistan is also reportedly working on developing a strong arsenal of UAVs alongside China's CAIG GJ-2 MALE-UCAV.

Project Azm

On 7 July 2017, the Pakistan Air Force announced the development of a fifth-generation fighter aircraft, a medium-altitude long-endurance unmanned aerial vehicle (MALE UAV) and munitions under the banner of Project Azm (Urdu for resolve/determination). Air Chief Marshal (ACM) Sohail Aman stated that the design phase for the MALE UAV was in its final stages.

Military exercises

The Pakistan Air Force sent a contingent of six F-16 A/B fighters to the 2004 international Anatolian Eagle exercise in Turkey.
In 2005, after around one year of planning, the PAF held the High Mark 2005 military exercise which lasted for one month and also involved the Pakistan Army and Pakistan Navy. The scenario saw two opposing forces, Blueland and Foxland, engaging in simulated combat which involved both offensive and defensive operations. It was stated that the exercise would consist of three stages and PAF aircraft would fly around 8200 sorties. The involvement of units from the Pakistan Army and Navy was aimed at providing more realistic operational scenarios. High Mark 2005 followed the Tempest-1 military exercise which was focused purely on air power but differed in terms of the duration, intensity and complexity of all air operations being conducted.

In 2008, the Turkish Air Force sent five F-16C/D fighters and 50 personnel from 191 Cobras Squadron to Pakistan to take part in the joint Indus Viper exercise at PAF Base Mushaf.

In the summer of 2005, a PAF team of 20 airmen, including pilots, navigators, engineers, maintenance technicians and a C-130E was sent to the United States to take part in the AMC (Air Mobility Command) Rodeo. The PAF again took part in the AMC Rodeo two years later, in July 2007.

In 2009, while undertaking combat operations against militants in the FATA and Swat regions, the PAF initiated the Saffron Bandit exercise with the aim of training the PAF's entire combat force to undertake such anti-terrorist operations.

In December 2009, the PAF sent six Chengdu F-7PG fighters of No. 31 Wing based at PAF Base Samungli to the United Arab Emirates to take part in the Air Tactics Leadership Course (ATLC)—also known as Exercise Iron Falcon—at Al Dhafra Air Base.

The PAF's High Mark 2010 exercise was launched on 15 March 2010, the first time a High Mark exercise had been conducted since 2005, after all PAF received their Air Tasking Orders (ATO). The country-wide exercise involved units based all over Pakistan, from Skardu to the Arabian Sea, at all Main Operating Bases and Forward Operating Bases. Joint operations involving the Pakistan Army and Pakistan Navy were also conducted, aiming to test and improve integration and co-operation between the three branches of the Pakistan Armed Forces. Operations emphasized a near-realistic simulation of a wartime environment, exposure of PAF aircrews to contemporary concepts of air combat, new employment concepts and joint operations between the Pakistan Air Force, Army and Navy. New inductions such as the JF-17 Thunder, Saab 2000 Erieye AEW&C and Il-78 MRTT also saw service in this exercise. On 6 April 2010, the end of the first phase of exercise High Mark 2010 was celebrated with a 90-minute firepower demonstration at the PAF's firing range facility in the deserts of Thal. The H-2 SOW was also shown to the public for the first time, being launched from around 60 km away before hitting its target, and a mock counter-insurgency operation was performed by participating forces. The demo heralded the beginning of High Mark 2010's second phase, where the PAF would practice joint operations with the Pakistan Army during its own exercise Azm-e-Nau-3 (New Resolve 3). During High Mark 2010, a Chengdu F-7 and Mirage 5 fighter practiced landing, refuelling and take-off operations from a motorway. It was reported that the PAF is in negotiations with the Ministry of Communications to set up any required facilities for PAF operations on various motorways in Pakistan.

In July 2010, the PAF sent six F-16B fighters of No. 9 Griffins Squadron and 100 PAF personnel to Nellis Air Force Base in the U.S. to participate in the international Red Flag exercise for the first time. During the exercise, the PAF pilots practiced in-flight refuelling with their F-16s using the Boeing KC-135 Stratotanker.

In October 2010, the PAF's No. 7 Bandits Squadron sent a team of its Dassault Mirage III ROSE fighters to Jordan to participate in the Falcon Air Meet 2010 exercise at the Azraq Royal Jordanian Air Base. January 2011 saw a PAF contingent of F-16A/B and Dassault Mirage fighters take part in the Al-Saqoor II exercise in Saudi Arabia with the Royal Saudi Air Force.

In March 2011, a joint Sino-Pakistani exercise, codenamed Shaheen-1, was conducted involving a contingent of Chinese aircraft and personnel from the PLAAF. Information on which aircraft were used by each side in the exercise remained classified, but photos of Pakistani pilots inspecting what appeared to be Chinese Shenyang J-11B fighters were released on the internet. The exercise lasted for around four weeks and was the first time the PLAAF had deployed to Pakistan and conducted "operational" aerial manoeuvres with the PAF.

Involvement in Pakistani society

The Pakistan Air Force, alongside other branches of the armed forces has played an integral part in the civil society of Pakistan since its inception. In 1996, General Jehangir Karamat described the Pakistani military's relations with Pakistan's populace:

In times of natural disaster such as the chaotic floods of 1992 or the October 2005 earthquake, PAF engineers, medical and logistics personnel alongside the rest of the armed forces played a major role in bringing relief aid and supplies to those who were affected.

In addition to the PAF's involvement in relief activities at home, it has also helped the Pakistani military's responses to natural disasters in many other countries globally. The PAF was involved in the dispatching of relief to Indonesia, Bangladesh and Sri Lanka after they were hit by the 2004 Indian Ocean earthquake and tsunami. Coordinating a synergized response, the Pakistan Armed Forces sent ships and helicopters with aid and personnel to assist in the international relief operation.

In popular culture
In Pakistani literature, the shaheen falcon has a special association with the poetry of the country's national poet, Allama Muhammad Iqbal. The bird also appears on the official representative badge of the Pakistan Air Force.

Various Urdu-language drama serials on the PAF have been written, produced, directed, and televised nationwide. Notable Urdu drama serials and films involving the PAF are Shahpar and Sherdil, which were televised on PTV and ARY Digital, respectively.

Notable personnel

The Nishan-e-Haider, is the highest military award of Pakistan, and is roughly equivalent in value to the United States' Medal of Honor. Pilot Officer Rashid Minhas (1951 – 20 August 1971) is the only officer of the PAF to have been awarded the Nishan-e-Haider for sacrificing his life to save an aircraft from being hijacked to India.

Other notable recipients of major military awards include:

Air Commodore Muhammad Mahmood Alam – awarded for downing nine fighters (of which five were downed within one minute) of the Indian Air Force in direct air-to-air combat. (Sitara-e-Jurat)
Air Commodore Najeeb Ahmed Khan – B-57 Canberra bomber pilot who raided the Adampur Airbase several times during the 1965 war.
Squadron Leader Sarfaraz Ahmed Rafiqui – awarded for refusing to abandon his group of fighters during a battle despite his guns being jammed. He continued his attempts to assist his squadron in the battle by chasing enemy fighters until eventually being shot down. (Hilal-e-Jurat, Sitara-e-Jurat)
Nur Khan

See also
Air Force Strategic Command
List of Pakistan Air Force bases
List of Pakistan Air Force squadrons
List of retired Pakistan Air Force aircraft
Special Services Wing - (SSW)
Pakistan Air Force Museum
Pakistan Aeronautical Complex

Notes

References

External links

 
 Aircraft of the Pakistan Air Force and general equipment

 
1947 establishments in Pakistan
Military units and formations established in 1947
Government of Pakistan